XHSCBN-FM is a community radio station on 107.3 FM in San Felipe, Guanajuato. The station is owned by the civil association Radio Actitud San Felipe, A.C.

History
Radio Actitud San Felipe filed for a community station on October 12, 2017. The station was awarded on December 5, 2018.

References

Radio stations in Guanajuato
Community radio stations in Mexico
Radio stations established in 2018